Planmed Oy, founded in 1987, is a Finnish company that designs and manufactures imaging systems and accessories for mammography as well as for orthopaedic imaging. The company is headquartered in Helsinki, Finland, and exports over 98% of its production to approximately 70 countries worldwide. Planmed's products are sold through a network of dealers. Planmed has a subsidiary in the United States and a sales office in the Netherlands.

Planmed Oy is part of the Finnish Planmeca Group.

Products
Digital mammography systems
Planmed Clarity 2D
Planmed Clarity 3D (Digital Breast Tomosynthesis)
Planmed ClarityGuide (Breast biopsy system)
Analog mammography units
Planmed Sophie Classic S
Orthopedic imaging systems
Planmed Verity - Extremity Cone Beam CT scanner

References

X-ray equipment manufacturers
Medical technology companies of Finland
Finnish brands